Pseudoloessa is a genus of beetles in the family Cerambycidae.

Species
 Pseudoloessa bispinosa (Breuning, 1960)
 Pseudoloessa javanica (Breuning, 1963)
 Pseudoloessa laosensis (Breuning, 1963)

References

Gyaritini